Tonga competed at the 2011 Pacific Games in Nouméa, New Caledonia between August 27 and September 10, 2011. The Tongan team had 139 members.

Archery

Tonga qualified one athlete.

Men
Sio Sifa Taumoepeau

Athletics

Tonga qualified seven athletes.

Men
Lars Fa'apoi -  Decathlon
Epeli Ika
Haui Hetesi Sakalia

Women
Olivia Eteaki
Vasi Feke
Kalina Mama'o
'Ana Po'Uhila -  Shot Put,  Discus Throw,  Hammer Throw

Badminton

Tonga qualified two athletes.

Men
Metuisela Vainikolo
Sione Vainikolo

Bodybuilding

Tonga qualified three athletes.

Men
Sitani Tautalanoa -  -80 kg
Mateo Vaihu -  -85 kg
Sione Fatai -  -90 kg

Boxing

Tonga qualified two athletes.

Men
Sosefo Kauatoa Falekaono -  -81 kg
Semisi Kalu -  91 kg & Over

Football

Tonga qualified a women's team.

Women
Siaila La’akulu
Emelita Moala
Buccilea Ongolea
Olive Mateialona
Koni Vungamoeahi
Sofia Filo
Eseta Vi
Salome Va’Enuku
Kiana Mu’amoholeva
Piuingi Feke
Laite Si’i Manu
Pauline Tonga
Neomai Tupou
Tania Silakivai
Vea Funaki
Suliana Utaatu
Ofa La’akulu
Wendy Feke
Lupe Likiliki
Tangimausia Ma’afu

Golf

Tonga qualified eight athletes.

Men
Kalolo Fifita
Tasisio Lolesio
Paula Piukala
Afa Vasi

Women
Losa Fapiano
Joyce Kaho
Elina Raass
Ana Veronesi

Surfing

Tonga qualified three athletes.

Men
Michael Burling
Alan Burling

Women
Anau-ki-uiha Burling

Swimming

Tonga qualified three athletes.

Men
Amini Fonua -  50m Breaststroke,  200m Breaststroke,  100m Breaststroke
Ifalemi Sau-Paea -  100m Butterfly,  200m Butterfly

Women
Charissa Panuve

Table Tennis

Tonga qualified nine athletes.  However the team was left behind in Brisbane, Australia and missed the team events, should the team arrive in time they may compete in the singles and doubles events. Only 1 athlete competed in the games.

Women
Salote Fungavai

Taekwondo

Tonga qualified three athletes.

Men
Faalongo Latu Tovo
Siaosi Uiha Veatupu -  -58 kg
Mirza Piu

Tennis

Tonga qualified six athletes.

Men
Saia Tuifua
Liua Feke
Liuakaetau Vakalahi
Tuai Finau

Women
Tamina Hemehema
Sarah Prescott

Triathlon

Tonga qualified one athlete.

Men
Gerhard Heinrich

Volleyball

Beach Volleyball

Tonga qualified a men's team.

Men
Samuela Fotu
Ti'o Fonohema

Indoor Volleyball

Tonga qualified a women's team.

Women
Setaita Laukau Tu'Ipulotu
Melenaite Akau'Ola
Katherine Tongotongo
Vika Koloa
Selaima Kaufusi
Mele Toutai
Beverly Vaitai
Tupou Veikoso
Ilaisaane Kaufusi
Salote Fungavai

Weightlifting

Tonga qualified four athletes.

Men
Akau Sisi Patiola
Palanite Ofa Ki Tonga
Ilaniume Finau -  -77 kg Snatch,  -77 kg Total,  -77 kg Clean & Jerk

Women
Tuipulotu Fakaola -  -63 kg Snatch,  -63 kg Total

References

2011 in Tongan sport
Nations at the 2011 Pacific Games
Tonga at the Pacific Games